Bernard Lynch (20 February 1917 – 3 November 2011) was a South African cricketer. He played in seventeen first-class matches for Eastern Province between 1936/37 and 1947/48.

See also
 List of Eastern Province representative cricketers

References

External links
 

1917 births
2011 deaths
South African cricketers
Eastern Province cricketers
Cricketers from Port Elizabeth